Adastra (from Latin ad astra, "to the stars") may refer to:

Adastra, a typeface designed in 1928 by Herbert Thannhaeuser of D. Stempel AG
Adastra Films, a French film production company
Adastra Minerals, a British mining company
Johnson RHJ-6 Adastra, an American glider design
Adastra, the ship in "Proxima Centauri", a 1935 short story by Murray Leinster

See also
 Ad astra (disambiguation)